The 1987 Stella Artois Championships was a men's tennis tournament played on grass courts at the Queen's Club in London, United Kingdom that was part of the 1987 Nabisco Grand Prix circuit. It was the 85th edition of the tournament and was held from 8 June until 15 June 1987. First-seeded Boris Becker won the singles title.

Finals

Singles

 Boris Becker defeated  Jimmy Connors 6–7, 6–3, 6–4
 It was Becker's 6th title of the year and the 18th of his career.

Doubles

 Guy Forget /  Yannick Noah defeated  Rick Leach /  Tim Pawsat 6–4, 6–4
 It was Forget's 5th title of the year and the 14th of his career. It was Noah's 6th title of the year and the 34th of his career.

References

External links
 Official website
 ATP tournament profile

 
Stella Artois Championships
Queen's Club Championships
Stella Artois Championships
Stella Artois Championships
Stella Artois Championships